The Iowa Reservation of the Iowa Tribe of Kansas and Nebraska straddles the borders of southeast Richardson County in southeastern Nebraska and Brown and Doniphan Counties in northeastern Kansas.  Tribal headquarters are west of White Cloud, Kansas. The reservation was defined in a treaty from March 1861. Today the tribe operates Casino White Cloud on the reservation.

History 
The Iowa (or Báxoje, their endonym) Tribe originated in the Great Lakes region. They migrated south and west into Missouri, but were relocated to Kansas under the provisions of the Platte Purchase of 1836. Subsequent treaties in 1854 and 1861 further reduced the Iowa land holdings to the "Diminished Reserve." A band of Iowas left the reservation for Indian Territory beginning in 1878. They became the Iowa Tribe of Oklahoma. The bands that stayed became the Iowa Tribe of Kansas and Nebraska.

Today, the Iowa reservation consists of  that are almost evenly divided between the states of Kansas and Nebraska. The reservation includes parts of Brown counties in Kansas and Richardson County in Nebraska.

Size 
There were  owned by the Tribe in Kansas, with an additional  in tribal member allotments. Today the tribe reports the Iowa Tribe owns  within the reservation.

Activities 
The tribe farms , with portions of the remaining acres balanced between in pastures and woods. There is also a haying operation that supports 150 cattle. The tribe also owns and operates Casino White Cloud and a service station, and employs 186 people. As a sovereign nation the reservation has its own police and fire department, tribal court, health clinic, community health representatives, a senior citizen center, and meal site for seniors with a delivery program. The tribe sponsors a Fourth of July rodeo, a demolition derby in August, and the Iowa Tribe Powwow each September.

See also 
 Native American tribes in Nebraska
 Native American tribes in Kansas (category)
 Ioway Tribal National Park

References

External links 
 Reservation tract map from the US Census.

Iowa Tribe of Kansas and Nebraska
American Indian reservations in Nebraska
Geography of Brown County, Kansas
Geography of Doniphan County, Kansas
Geography of Richardson County, Nebraska
American Indian reservations in Kansas
1861 establishments in the United States